Kyzyl-Tuu is a village in the Osh Region of Kyrgyzstan. It is part of the Kara-Suu District. It lies in the valley of the river Ak-Buura, 5 km south of Papan. Its population was in 2,132 in 2021.

References 

Populated places in Osh Region